Puntioplites waandersi is a species of ray-finned fish in the genus Puntioplites from south east Asia and the islands of Sumatra and Borneo.

Footnotes 

 

Waandersi
Fish described in 1859